Lincoln-Way Central High School, LWC, or Central is a public four-year high school about 3.5 miles south of Interstate 80 near the intersection of Schoolhouse Road and Lincoln Highway in New Lenox, Illinois, a southwest suburb of Chicago, Illinois, in the United States. It is the original school of Lincoln-Way Community High School District 210, which also includes Lincoln-Way East High School and Lincoln-Way West High School.  Lincoln-Way Central and Lincoln-Way West are located in New Lenox, Lincoln-Way East is located in Frankfort. Effective since the 2016–2017 school year, Lincoln-Way North High School, in Frankfort Square, closed due to financial troubles and the district is now a three school district. District 210 offices are located at Lincoln-Way Central.

History
In June 1952, another election provided for the approval and construction of Lincoln-Way High School.  The new high school district would draw students which until then had been attending Joliet Township High School, Bloom Township High School, Carl Sandburg High School, and Peotone High School. The cornerstone was ceremonially installed on October 25, 1953, after construction had begun. Lincoln-Way opened its doors to students on September 7, 1954. The name of the school was selected by one Mrs. Florence Pittman and the board of education officially adopted it as "Lincoln-Way". The charter members of the student body voted to have red and black as their school colors. Lyrics to the Lincoln-Way Central school song were written by Robert Taylor and Betty Tryon, set to the tune of the University of Chicago pep song.

Bond issues for additions to the original building were approved in 1957, 1960, 1962, and 1969.  The 1969 bond issue approved a ninth grade building which was built north of the main building.  In 1971 the north building opened up, accommodating 700 students.

In 1994, a field house was added to the campus. Then in 1998, citizens of District No. 210 approved a $60 million building bond referendum to split the existing high school freshmen-sophomore / junior-senior configuration into two separate four-year high schools while adding to the existing two schools an academic wing with 50 classrooms at each campus, olympic-sized swimming pools, as well as the addition of a fine arts auditorium and music classrooms at Central. The changeover became official for the 2001–02 school year as the Central campus opened as Lincoln-Way Central High School.

Lincoln-Way Central is known as simply “Lincoln-Way” by area residents because it is the original of the four high schools, rich in over sixty-five years of tradition and history.  Students here are noted for their exceeding pride. Phrases such as "We are Central",  "Once a Knight, Always a Knight", and "Knight Pride" exemplify students' school spirit.

Music

Lincoln-Way Central's Music Department consists of multiple extracurricular music groups, including the Wind Ensemble and Symphonic Concert Bands, two jazz ensembles, (Jazz I and II), pep band, orchestra, guitar studio, piano, multiple choirs, including Madrigal Singers, and the school's marching band, the Marching Knights.

The Marching Knights consisted of 101 student members as of the 2012–2013 season. The group marched in the 2005 Presidential Inaugural Parade. The band has been in existence since 1954. In 2017, the Marching Knights combined with the three other Lincoln-Way area High Schools to form the Lincoln-Way Marching Band.

Notable Music Department events include:
 2020 – Macy's Thanksgiving Day Parade (postponed to 2021 due to COVID-19)
 2019 – Tournament of Roses Parade
 2012 – Trip to San Diego (Big Bay Balloon Parade)
 2010 – Trip to Orlando, FL (Citrus Bowl Parade)
 2008 – Trip to Italy
 2007 – Opening Ceremony for I-355
 2007 – Guitar studio and orchestra tour of Toronto, Canada
 2005 – Presidential Inaugural Parade Participants
 2000 – Pasadena Tournament of Roses Parade
 1999 – ISU State Champions
 1996 – WGI – Percussion Scholastic World Class – 4th Place
 1995 – WGI – Percussion Scholastic World Class – 2nd Place (Silver Medal)
 1994 – WGI – Percussion Scholastic World Class – 1st Place (Gold Medal)
 1993 – WGI – Percussion Scholastic World Class – 2nd Place (Silver Medal)
 1987 – Performance at the Special Olympics in South Bend, IN
 1984 – Orange Bowl Parade and Field competition, Miami, FL (3rd place National Field Show competition)
 1982 – Pasadena Tournament of Roses Parade
 1974 – Marching Knights formed
 1968 – Opening Ceremony for I-80

Athletics
Lincoln-Way Central competes as a member of the Southwest Suburban Conference.  The school is a member of the Illinois High School Association (IHSA), which governs most athletics and competitive activities in Illinois.  Teams are called the "Knights".

The school sponsors interscholastic teams for young men and women in basketball, bowling, cross country, golf, gymnastics, soccer, swimming & diving, tennis, track & field, volleyball, esports and water polo. Young women may compete in badminton, cheerleading, poms, and softball, while young men may also compete in baseball, football, and wrestling. Now recognized by the IHSA, the school's athletic department also oversees lacrosse teams for young men and women.

The following teams have won or finished in the top four of their respective IHSA sponsored state championship tournament or meet:

 Badminton: 2nd Place (2007–08, 2008–09)
 Bowling (Boys): 3rd Place (2007–08, 2017–2018)
 Cross Country (Boys): 3rd Place (1968–69, 1990–91);  4th Place (1997–98)
 Football: State Champions (1997–98); 2nd Place (1996–97); Semifinalists (1999–2000, 2000–01)
 Golf (Boys): 4th place (1984–85)
 Gymnastics (Boys): State Champions (2005–2006, 2010–2011); 2nd place (1996–97)
 Soccer (Boys): 2nd Place (1999–2000, 2000–01); 3rd Place (2001–02); 4th place (1992–93)
 Soccer (Girls): 2nd Place (1998–99, 1999–2000); 4th Place (1997–98, 2004–05, 2006–07)
 Softball: State Champions (2007–08)
 Track & Field (Boys): 3rd Place (1996–97)
 Track & Field (Girls): 4th Place (1973–74)
 Volleyball (Boys): 4th Place (1998–99)
 Wrestling: 3rd Place (2007–08)
 Water Polo (Girls): 2nd Place (2012–2013)

Activities and clubs
 AFJROTC Drill Team
Adventure Challenge Club
 Art Club
 Book Club
 Chess Club & Chess Team
 Class Officers
 Color Guard
 Computer Technology Club
 Creative Writing Club – Calliope
 Environmental Action Club (EAC)
 Fellowship of Christian Athletes (FCA)
 Future Business Leaders of America (FBLA)
 Future Educators of America (FEA)
 Future Farmers of America (FFA)
 Gay-Straight Alliance (GSA)
 Interact Club
 International Club
 Intramurals
 Jazz Band
 Junior Classical League (JCL)
 Key Club
 Leadership, Education, and Opportunity Club (LEO)
 Literary Magazine
 Madrigals
 Marching Band – Marching Knights
 Mathletes
 Men's Choir – Singing Knights
 Mu Alpha Theta
 National Honor Society (NHS)
 Newspaper
 Nursing home visits – Noble Knights
 Orchesis
 Peer Helpers
 Peer Mediators – Link Crew
 Peer Mentors
 Pep Band
 Pi Sigma Pi
 Robotics and Engineering Team
 Scholastic Bowl
 Science Club
 Skills USA
 Snowball
 Speech Team
 Spirit Club – Knightmares/Red Rush
 Spring Musical
 Student Ambassadors
 Student Council
 Student Athletic Training
 Students Against Destructive Decisions (SADD)
 Teens Against Tobacco Use (TATU)
 Television Club – LWCTV
 Theatre Company
 Tri-M National Music Honor Society
 Vocal Jazz Ensemble
 Welcoming committee
 Winter Guard
 Women's Choir – Treble Makers
 Yearbook

Notable alumni

 James Augustine (2002), former NBA forward for Illinois' 2005 NCAA tournament runners-up who played for the NBA's Orlando Magic (2006–08).
 Christopher Bear (2000), drummer for the band Grizzly Bear.
 Cougars, rock band
 Tony Cingrani (2007), MLB pitcher who is currently a free agent; previously pitched for the Cincinnati Reds and Los Angeles Dodgers.
 Karla DeVito, singer, actress, and voice artist.
 Ned Grabavoy (2001), Major League Soccer midfielder (2004–16); helped Real Salt Lake win 2009 MLS Cup with kick in 5-4 penalty shootout following a 1–1 draw.
 Kevin Lynch (1984), vice president of technology, Apple, Inc.
 Rob Ninkovich (2002), NFL defensive end (2006–17) for Super Bowl champion New England Patriots, played in Super Bowl XLVI, XLIX and LI, winning twice; also played for Miami Dolphins.
Casey Paus (2001), former University of Washington quarterback
Cory Paus (1998), former quarterback for the UCLA Bruins and Calgary Stampeders of the CFL
 Johan Reinhard, author and explorer-in-residence with the National Geographic Society.  He has studied the lands and people of the Andes Mountains and Himalaya Mountains in addition to other areas.
 Mark Suppelsa (1980), radio and television anchorman at WGN-TV.

References

External links
 Official website

Public high schools in Illinois
Schools in Will County, Illinois